In Australian federal politics, the Leader of the Opposition is an elected member of parliament (MP) in the Australian House of Representatives who leads the opposition. The Leader of the Opposition, by convention, is the leader of the largest political party in the House of Representatives that is not in government.

When in parliament, the opposition leader sits on the left-hand side of the centre table, in front of the opposition and opposite the prime minister. The opposition leader is elected by his or her party according to its rules. A new leader of the opposition may be elected when the incumbent dies, resigns, or is challenged for the leadership.

Australia is a constitutional monarchy with a parliamentary system and is based on the Westminster model. The term "opposition" has a specific meaning in the parliamentary sense. It is an important component of the Westminster system, with the opposition directing criticism at the government and attempts to defeat and replace the Government. The opposition is therefore known as the "government in waiting" and it is a formal part of the parliamentary system. It is in opposition to the government, but not to the Crown; hence the term "His Majesty's Loyal Opposition".

To date there have been 35 opposition leaders, 19 of whom also have served terms as prime minister. 

The current Leader of the Opposition is Peter Dutton of the Liberal Party, following a leadership election on 30 May 2022. The current Deputy Leader of the Opposition is Sussan Ley, who was elected deputy leader of the Liberal Party on the same date.

Role
The opposition leader is the opposition's counterpart to the prime minister. The opposition leader is expected to be ready to form a new government if the incumbent government is unable to continue in office. This typically occurs when the opposition wins a federal election, after which the opposition leader is appointed prime minister. However, the opposition leader may also be called upon to form government if the incumbent government loses the confidence of the House (most recently in 1941) or that of the governor-general (most recently in 1975).

The opposition leader is the head of the shadow ministry, allocating portfolios and, in the case of the Coalition, determining its membership. The opposition leader is assisted by a deputy leader of the opposition, who is also recognised in the standing orders and entitled to an additional salary. Both the opposition leader and deputy opposition leader are entitled to a degree of special preference from the Speaker of the House.

The position of opposition leader has no constitutional basis but exists as a matter of convention in the Westminster system. A 1960 inquiry into parliamentary salaries and allowances observed:

The Leader of the Opposition has to make himself master of all the business which comes before the House (not merely that of one or two departments); he has to do this at times at short notice and under constant pressure; and he gets no help from permanent officials. At all times he is the spokesman for those who are critical of or opposed to the Government, and he must be unceasingly vigilant and active. He and the Prime Minister should be the most powerful agents in guiding and forming public opinion on issues of policy.

Whereas according to the Coalition agreement the Leader of the National Party serves as Deputy Prime Minister when the Coalition is in government, no such agreement exists when the Coalition is in Opposition, and no National Party politician has ever served as Deputy Leader of the Opposition.

History
George Reid became the de facto leader of the opposition in the lead-up to the inaugural 1901 federal election, following the appointment of Edmund Barton to lead a caretaker government as Australia's first prime minister. His status was confirmed when the House of Representatives met for the first time after the election. The opposition leader was initially not entitled to any salary or entitlements beyond those of an ordinary member of parliament. As a result, Reid had to maintain his legal practice in Sydney to support himself and was able to attend just over one-third of the sitting days in the first session of parliament.

Although the role was firmly established, the House did not formally recognise the position of opposition leader in its records until 1920. It was recognised by statute for the first time with the passage of the Parliamentary Allowances Act 1920, which granted its holder an additional allowance. Prime Minister Andrew Fisher had previously offered Opposition Leader Alfred Deakin an allowance in 1910. Deakin declined, but did accept a paid secretary. In 1931, the office was incorporated into the House's standing orders for the first time, with the opposition leader granted the right to exceed the time limit for speeches in certain instances.

Salary
The opposition leader's salary is determined by the Remuneration Tribunal, an independent statutory body. As of 1 July 2019, the incumbent is entitled to a parliamentarian's base salary of A$211,250 plus an additional 85% loading, equating to a salary of around $390,000.

List of leaders of the opposition

List of deputy leaders of the opposition

See also

 Prime Minister of Australia
 List of prime ministers of Australia
 Shadow Cabinet of Australia
 Politics of Australia

Notes

References

Australia
Lists of Australian politicians
Lists of political office-holders in Australia
Australia